Jenny Wiley Theatre was a non-profit organization in Kentucky that produced classic Broadway musicals, comedies, historical dramas and holiday productions at both the Jenny Wiley Amphitheatre, located within the Jenny Wiley State Resort Park, and an indoor venue in Pikeville.In 2019, the company furloughed its staff, cancelled its performances, and was evicted from both its locations by the municipal property owners. Its programming has been replaced by the Appalachian Arts in Pikeville.

The theater's first musical was South Pacific, performed in the summer of 1965.  Some theater alumni and staff have later achieved success in television, film and national theater. These include: 
 Michael Cerveris, who won two Tony awards, one for his performance in Tommy  in 1994, and one for his performance in Assassins on Broadway.
 Boyd Holbrook, who is best known for his roles in Logan and Narcos, was picked up by a modelling agency in 2001 while working part-time as a carpenter for the theatre.
 Christine Johnson, Nettie Fowler in the original Broadway cast of Carousel; Sharon Lawrence from ABC's NYPD Blue and Desperate Housewives.
 James Barbour, who played the Beast in Disney's Broadway production of Beauty and the Beast and was Tony-nominated for his role as Mr. Rochester in the musical, Jane Eyre.
 Jim Varney, Ernest Goes to Camp; Tommy Kirk, Old Yeller.
 Ron Palillo, Welcome Back, Kotter.
 Eileen Bittman Barnett, Days of Our Lives.
 Cynthia Bostick, As the World Turns.
 Lawrence Leritz, Broadway and Beyond.
 Jeff Silbar, composer of "The Wind Beneath My Wings."
 Randy Jones of the Village People singing group.
 Paige Davis, host of TLC's Trading Spaces.
 Matthew Patrick, internet personality and creator of popular YouTube webseries Game Theory, Film Theory, and Food Theory.

References

Theatre companies in Kentucky
Performing arts centers in Kentucky
Buildings and structures in Floyd County, Kentucky
Tourist attractions in Floyd County, Kentucky
Buildings and structures in Pike County, Kentucky
Tourist attractions in Pike County, Kentucky
Pikeville, Kentucky
1964 establishments in Kentucky
2019 disestablishments in Kentucky